Ifa Sudewi is Chief Judge of Purwakarta Regency, Indonesia. She is best known as the first female judge to be appointed to the 2002 Bali bombings trials. Educated in Solo, Java, she became a judge in 1990.

References

External links
Judge Sudewi undaunted by death penalty   The Sun-Herald - May 25, 2003
Judge quotes Koran as Bali mastermind screams defiance The Sun-Herald - September 11, 2003
Court convicts Bali commander BBC - 10 September 2003
Five bombers were prepared to die in Bali  The Sunday Telegraph - May 25, 2003

1960s births
Women judges
Indonesian Hindus
People from Purwakarta Regency
Converts to Hinduism from Islam
Living people
Indonesian former Muslims
2002 Bali bombings
20th-century Indonesian judges
21st-century Indonesian judges